Myopites longirostris is a species of tephritid or fruit flies in the genus Myopites of the family Tephritidae.

Distribution
Italy, Croatia, France.

References

Tephritinae
Myopites
Insects described in 1846
Diptera of Europe